Raptori was a rap group, formed 1989 in Hyvinkää, Finland. They were pioneers of Finnish rap music.

Raptori were both aggressive and humoristic at once, and often used counter-intuitive rhymes. During the last years of 1990s dozens of new Finnish rap groups appeared but Raptori was among the first. Raptori's first album, Moe!, was highly successful, selling over 80 000 copies and yielding a number one single (on Finnish chart) "Oi Beibi". After their second album Raptori broke up (or at least left the scene) but they came back in 2000 and released their third album. The band made yet another comeback in 2010 and released new compilation album Sekoelma which included one new song and two remixes of old songs.

In the mid-1990s, Ismo Tapio Heikkilä and Juho Peltomaa formed a band called Allekirjoittanut with Tommi Lindell. They have released one album, Generation Å.  A fellow Raptori member, Tero Tapio Kaikkonen, also appeared on that release.

Members 
Juho Samuli Peltomaa (JuFo III)
Ismo Tapio Heikkilä (Izmo)
Tero Tapio Kaikkonen (Kaivo)

Production staff 
Manne Railo (Mitro), Producer

Releases

Albums 
Moe! (1990)
Tulevat tänne sotkemaan meidän ajopuuteorian (1991)
Epäviralliset Muistelmat (1996)
Ouu-raisakson! (2000)
Sekoelma (2010)

Singles 
 Oi Beibi / Tuhansien sulojen maa (Megamania) 7" 12"
 Raptori (Megamania 1990) 12'
 Debi Gibson (Viiraa Pääzä Mix) (Megamania 1990) 12"
 Tyyris Tyllerö / Älä (Hekumaa) (Megamania) 12"
 Karvanoppaelvis / Sukellus Pumpuliin (Megamania 1991) 7"
 Rattijuoppo (Megamania 1991) 7"
 Debi Gibson (3000 Mix) (Reel Art 2000) CDS
 Kumitissit / Oi Beibi (Raptori vs. Caater)(Reel Art 2000) CDS
 Oi Beibi 16 (Sony Music 2010)

Videos 
 Moe! (1990)
 Raptori (1990)
 Ajopuutaheinää (1991)
 Hiphopmusiikkia (1999)The video for Hiphopmusiikkia is a spoof of the video from Bomfunk MC's Freestyler, filmed using the same Helsinki Metro stations.
 Oi Beibi 16 (2010)
 Tosi tarttuva täytebiisi 16 (2010)

External links 
(Suomi) Raptori homepage

Finnish hip hop groups